Rationale of the Dirty Joke: An Analysis of Sexual Humor is a book by American social critic and folklorist Gershon Legman. The book analyzes more than 2000 jokes and folk tales in terms of social, psychological, and historical significance. It was first published by Grove Press in 1968, was later reprinted in hard-cover by Indiana University, and was years out of print until reissued by Simon & Schuster in 2006.  The second volume, No Laughing Matter: Rationale of the Dirty Joke: An Analysis of Sexual Humor, 2nd Series, had to be paid for by subscription to support publishing, as it was the "dirty dirties".

According to literary critic Mikita Brottman, "Contemporary humor theorists now ... give a warm, good-natured cast to the telling of jokes, without the nastiness and aggression that Legman -- and, indeed, Freud -- regard as an integral part of the joke-telling enterprise."

There were several reviews of the book published in 1969. Brottman suggests, however, "all its reviewers seem to have misunderstood ... that the point of the book ... is trying to understand what the dirty joke itself is trying to explain".

Notes

See also
 Off-color humor
 Black comedy
 Ribaldry
 Toilet humour

References
 Brottman, Mikita : Funny Peculiar : Gershon Legman and the Psychopathology of Humor. Analytic Press, Hillsdale (NJ), 2004.
 Legman, Gershon. Rationale of the Dirty Joke: An Analysis of Sexual Humor. First Series. Reprint. New York: Simon and Schuster.

1968 non-fiction books
Books about humor
Off-color humor